The Guyana cricket team is the representative first class cricket team of Guyana. The side does not take part in any international competitions, but rather in inter-regional competitions in the Caribbean, such as the Regional Four Day Competition and the Regional Super50), and the best players may be selected for the West Indies team, which plays international cricket. The team competes under the franchise name Guyana Harpy Eagles.

The list of prominent cricketers who have played for Guyana includes Basil Butcher, Shivnarine Chanderpaul, Colin Croft, Roy Fredericks, Lance Gibbs, Roger Harper, Carl Hooper, Devendra Bishoo, Alvin Kallicharran, Rohan Kanhai, Clive Lloyd and Ramnaresh Sarwan.

History
The cricket team has been known under two other names – they were first known as Demerara when they played in the first first-class cricket game of the West Indies, against Barbados in 1865, and they retained that name until 1899, when it was finally changed to British Guiana (they had also played first-class cricket in 1895 as British Guiana). The name of British Guiana stuck until 1965–66, when the nation and thus the team changed to its current name. From 1971 until the mid-1980s two regional sides competed in an annual first class match for the Jones Cup, later renamed the Guystac Trophy.

Guyana has won the domestic first class title a total of ten times plus one shared since its inception in 1965–66, which is the third to Jamaica and Barbados.

In List A cricket, Guyana reached the final of the domestic competition four times in the early 2000s, but the last victory was in 2005–06. They have won a total of nine regional List A titles, including two shared titles, which is second only to Trinidad and Tobago with 12 titles (including one shared).

In June 2018, Guyana was named the Best First-Class Team of the Year at the annual Cricket West Indies' Awards.

Grounds 
Guyana's main home ground used to be the Bourda ground in Georgetown, where they played 131 of their 181 first class home games, and where 30 Test matches were hosted. As of 2007 Guyana have played most of their home matches at the Guyana National Stadium at Providence, East Bank Demerara. Other grounds include the Albion Sports Complex in the Berbice region, which has hosted 24 Guyana matches and five ODIs, and from 1997–98 the Enmore Recreation Ground, East Coast Demerara, where they have played five games.

Squad
Listed below are players who have represented Guyana in either the 2018–19 Regional Four Day Competition or the 2018–19 Regional Super50. Players with international caps are listed in bold.

Most runs for Guyana

Honours 
 Regional Four Day Competition (11): 1972–73, 1974–75, 1982–83, 1986–87, 1992–93, 1997–98 (shared), 2014-15, 2015-16, 2016-17, 2017-18, 2018-19
 Domestic one-day competition (9): 1979–80, 1982–83, 1984–85, 1992–93 (shared), 1995–96 (shared), 1998–99, 2001–02, 2003–04, 2005–06
 Caribbean Twenty20 (1): 2010
 Inter-Colonial Tournament (defunct) (5): 1895–96, 1929–30, 1934–35, 1935–36, 1937–38
 Stanford 20/20 (defunct) (1): 2008

See also 
 List of Guyanese representative cricketers
 List of international cricketers from Guyana

References

External links
 Cricinfo
 CricketArchive
 2005–06 KFC Cup Squad from Cricinfo

National team
West Indian first-class cricket teams
National cricket teams
Cricket
1965 establishments in British Guiana
Cricket clubs established in 1965